2006 Meistriliiga was the 16th season of the Meistriliiga, Estonia's premier football league. Levadia won their fourth title.

Season overview
FC Levadia won the 2006 Meistriliiga championship and entered the 2007/08 UEFA Champions League 1st Qualifying Round. Narva Trans finished in their best ever silver-medal position, while FC Flora also gained a place compared to last season on 2005 champions FC TVMK's disappointing year. The latter will enter the Intertoto Cup and the other two above mentioned teams enter the UEFA Cup qualifying rounds in the summer of 2007.

The bottom of the table provided some intrigue as well. The two Tartu teams ended mid-table, with Tammeka's youthful-looking squad impressing under experienced coach and ex-international Sergei Ratnikov, in his first year as the head coach. Pärnu Vaprus was perhaps the surprise package of the season finishing seventh on their debut year in the Meistriliiga and bringing Pärnu back on to the Estonian football map. Mainly Russian-speaking Tallinn team, FC Ajax Lasnamäe, proved a point by staying up against all predictions. JK Viljandi Tulevik had a dreadful year and had to go into the play-offs against Esiliiga's JK Tallinna Kalev and lost, which should've meant their relegation a step down. But after the merging of the Tartu clubs, JK Maag and Tammeka, they will still be in the Meistriliiga in 2007. The team with the youngest average aged squad in the league, Warrior Valga, were relegated without a meaningful fight.

The league's top scorers were two JK Narva Trans strikers Maksim Gruznov (with 31 goals) and Dmitri Lipartov (27 goals). FC Flora Tallinn's Vjatšeslav Zahovaiko scored 25, FC Levadia Tallinn's Indrek Zelinski 21 goals.

League table

Relegation play-off

Both games were awarded - / + to Tallinna Kalev since Tulevik fielded an ineligible player.

Kalev had originally won 1 – 1 with away goals

Tulevik kept their place in the Meistriliiga as a result of merger of Tammeka Tartu and Maag Tartu.

Results
Each team played every opponent four times, twice at home and twice on the road, for a total of 36 games.

First half of season

Second half of season

Season statistics

Top scorers

See also
 2006 Esiliiga

References

Meistriliiga seasons
1
Estonia
Estonia